Md. Nurul Islam  (born 5 January 1956) is a Bangladesh Awami League politician. He is the incumbent minister of railways and Jatiya Sangsad member representing the Panchagarh-2 constituency. In January 2019, he was appointed as minister of railways.

Early life
Islam completed his bachelor's in law from the University of Dhaka.

Career
Islam was elected to parliament from Panchagarh-2 on 5 January 2014 as a Bangladesh Awami League candidate. He inaugurated Kalidhaho bridge on 28 August 2015.

Personal life
Islam's first wife, Nilufar Jahan, died in 2018. Together they had three children. He then married Shammi Akter Moni in June 2021.

References

Living people
1956 births
University of Dhaka alumni
Awami League politicians
9th Jatiya Sangsad members
10th Jatiya Sangsad members
11th Jatiya Sangsad members
Railways ministers of Bangladesh
Place of birth missing (living people)